Marcelin Pleynet (born 23 December 1933, in Lyon, France) is a French poet, art critic and essayist. He was Managing Editor of the influential magazine Tel Quel from 1962 to 1982, and co-edits the journal L'Infini (Gallimard) with Philippe Sollers. He was Professor of Aesthetics at the École nationale supérieure des Beaux-Arts in Paris from 1987 to 1998. He has published numerous monographs on 20th-century art, notably Situation de l’art moderne: Paris-New York (in association with William Rubin), Henri Matisse, Robert Motherwell: La vérité en peinture, Les Modernes et la tradition, Les États-Units de la peinture and L’art abstrait. He has also published books of poetry and the novel Prise d’otage, and an edition of Giorgione et les deux Vénus.

Bibliography

Essays
Le savoir-vivre, Gallimard, 2006
Alechinsky le pinceau voyageur, Gallimard, 2002
Rothko et la France, L'épure Eds, 1999
Rimbaud en son temps, Gallimard, 2005
Judit Reigl, L'insolite-Adam Biro, 2001
Les voyageurs de l'an 2000, Gallimard, 2000
Poésie et "révolution", la révolution du style, Pleins Feux Eds, 2000
Chardin - Le sentiment et l'esprit du temps, L'épure Eds, 1999
Rothko et la France, L'épure Eds, 1999
Notes sur le motif suivi de La Dogana, Dumerchez Naoum, 1998
Lautréamont, Seuil, 1998
L'homme habite poétiquement, Actes Sud, 1998
Une saison, Dumerchez Naoum, 1996
Henri Matisse, Gallimard, 1993
Les modernes et la tradition, Gallimard, 1990
L'Art abstrait, tome 5 (avec Michel Ragon), Adrien Maeght, 1988
New-York Series, les sculptures en cire de Félix Rozen, galerie Gary, Paris, 1979/88
Les Etats-Unis de la peinture, Seuil, 1986
Fenêtre sur le Japon, exhibition of Félix Rozen, Central color Paris, 1986
La place de Félix Rozen dans l'art contemporain (Situation pièce, Centre d'Action Culturelle, Saint Brieux, text read by the author), 1984
Painting and System, Univ of Chicago, 1984
Modernism-Modernity and the Philosophy of History, NSCAD Univ Press, 1983/2004

Poetry
Le Pontos, Gallimard, 2002
Premières poésies, Cadex, 1988
Fragments du choeur - vers et proses, Denoël, 1984
Le propre du temps, Gallimard, 1995
Stanze, Seuil, 1973

Novels
Prise d'otage, Gallimard 1986
La vie à deux ou à trois,  Gallimard, 1992

References
Philippe Forest, Histoire de Tel Quel, Seuil, coll. « Fiction et Cie », 1995.

External links
 Official website

1933 births
Living people
French literary critics
French essayists
French poets
Writers from Lyon
French male essayists
French male poets
Prix Fénéon winners